Timothy Hugh Bagley (born August 17, 1957) is an American actor and comedian, who has appeared in numerous films and television programs. He had recurring roles on the TV series Will & Grace, Hope & Gloria, Strip Mall, According to Jim, The King of Queens, Monk, Help Me Help You, 10 Items or Less, $#*! My Dad Says, and portrayed Richard Pratt on the Showtime series, Web Therapy. Previously, Bagley had a recurring role as Principal Toby Pearson on the American sitcom Teachers, and as Peter in the Netflix series Grace and Frankie.

Career

Comedy career
In 1989, Bagley began studying with The Groundlings, and was soon writing and performing with their prestigious Main Stage Company. Although he retired from the theatre's Main Company in the mid 1990s, Bagley still comes back regularly to perform in The Groundlings’ all-improv show Cookin' with Gas. In 1995, Bagley left the Groundlings and turned his attention to television. After guest appearances on Diagnosis: Murder and Seinfeld, he landed his first regular role on the Showtime series Howie Mandel's Sunny Skies.

Television career
Since breaking into television in the early 1990s, Bagley has become a familiar face on primetime television. He has guest starred on such shows as Seinfeld, Wings, Dharma & Greg, According to Jim, Curb Your Enthusiasm, The X Files, Suddenly Susan, ER, Ellen, 3rd Rock from the Sun, The Nanny, and Desperate Housewives.

Bagley has also had regular and recurring roles in such hit shows as The King of Queens, Hope & Gloria, Strip Mall, and 7th Heaven, and portrayed fellow OCD sufferer Harold Krenshaw on Monk for several episodes, often antagonizing the titular character, Adrian Monk and his assistants, Sharona Fleming and Natalie Teeger. He also appeared in "Grimm" as a blutbad. He is perhaps best known on television for his appearances as Larry, one half of a married gay couple with an adopted daughter, on the hit sitcom Will & Grace.

Bagley also starred with Lisa Kudrow and Victor Garber on Web Therapy, the series of online vignettes developed by Kudrow which was adapted into a half-hour show by Showtime. He can also be seen as Principal Pearson on the 2016 TV Land  comedy Teachers.

Film career
In addition to his work in independent films, Bagley has appeared in big-budget movies like The Mask, Austin Powers: The Spy Who Shagged Me and Knocked Up.  Other high-profile films include Employee of the Month, Happy, Texas and Mistress, starring Robert De Niro. He appeared briefly at the beginning of the 2006 film Accepted.

Personal life
Bagley is gay and talks openly about his early struggles to be accepted. His partner of 10 years died in 1995 from AIDS and kidney failure.

Filmography

Film

Television

References

External links
 
 
 Official web site

1957 births
American male film actors
American male television actors
Living people
Male actors from Wisconsin
Male actors from Minneapolis
20th-century American male actors
21st-century American male actors
The Young Americans members